Sean or Shaun Flaherty may refer to:

People
 Sean Flaherty (politician) (born 1985), Maine politician
 Shawn Flaherty, Pennsylvania politician
 Sean Patrick Flaherty, American actor and producer

Fictional characters
 Sean Flaherty (EastEnders), fictional character
 Shaun Flaherty, character in Best Friends Together